A troll is a mythological creature.

Troll may also refer to:

Places
 Troll (research station), a Norwegian Antarctic research station on Queen Maud Land
 Troll Airfield, an airfield nearby
 Troll gas field, a large reservoir of gas in the northern North Sea
 Troll A platform, a Norwegian production platform for this gas field
 Troll Ski Resort, a ski area in the Cariboo region of British Columbia

People

Surname
 Carl Troll (1899–1975), German geographer
 Karl Troll (1865–1954), Austrian architect
 Max Troll (1902–1972), German communist and police informer
 Wilhelm Troll (1897–1978), German botanist

Types of people
 Troll (gay slang), a gay man who wanders about looking for sexual partners
 Troll, a nickname for a resident of the Lower Peninsula of Michigan
 Internet troll, a person who attempts to disrupt a community or garner attention and controversy through provocative messages

Arts, entertainment, and media

Fictional entities
 Troll (Artemis Fowl), a creature in the Artemis Fowl series
 Troll (Dungeons & Dragons), a monster in the Dungeons & Dragons setting
 Troll (Harry Potter), a creature in J. K. Rowling's Harry Potter universe
 Troll (Marvel Comics), a fictional character appearing in Marvel Comics
 Troll (Middle-earth), a creature in J. R. R. Tolkien's Middle-earth universe
 Troll (Youngblood), an Image comics character
 Troll, a playable race in World of Warcraft
 Troll, one of the pair of fictional demons Hag and Troll appearing in Marvel Comics

Films
 Troll (film), a 1986 fantasy film
 Troll 2, an unrelated sequel to the above film produced under the title Goblins
 Troll 3 (disambiguation), two different possible sequels, again unrelated to the previous two films
 Troll (2022 film), a Norwegian monster film
 Trolls (film), a 2016 animated family film

Literature
 The Troll (2009), a children's story by Julia Donaldson and David Roberts
 "Troll Bridge" (1991), a Discworld short story by Terry Pratchett

Music
 Troll (Norwegian band), a black metal band formed in 1992
 Troll (Swedish band), a 1985–1992 pop band
 The Trolls, a 2001–2004 American rock band fronted by Iggy Pop
 Troll, an album by Lumsk, 2005
 Troll (EP), by James Ferraro, 2017
 "Trollz" (song), by 6ix9ine and Nicki Minaj, 2020
 "Troll", a song by Bruno Sutter from Bruno Sutter, 2015
 "Troll", a song by IU from Lilac, 2021

Public art
 Bay Bridge Troll, a piece of art in the Oakland-San Francisco Bay Bridge, US
 Fremont Troll, a piece of public art in Seattle, Washington, US

Television
 "Trolls", a Lilyhammer episode
 Trollz (TV series), an animated show based on the Troll doll

Other uses in arts, entertainment, and media
 Troll doll, a doll created by Thomas Dam in the 1960s
 Trolls (video game) (1992), a PC game by Capstone Software

Law
 Copyright troll, in intellectual property rights
 Patent troll, in intellectual property rights
 Trademark troll, in intellectual property rights

Transportation
 Troll (automobile), a Norwegian car manufacturer
 IWL TR 150 Troll 1, an East German 1960s motor scooter by Industriewerke Ludwigsfelde

Other uses
 Trolling (fishing), the practice of fishing by drawing a baited line or lure behind a boat

See also
 Toll (disambiguation)
 Trawling, a method of fishing that involves pulling a fishing net
 Trollbloods, a faction in the Hordes game setting
 Trollhunter, a 2010 Norwegian fantasy horror film made in the form of a mockumentary
 Trolltooth (disambiguation)
Trollface, an art piece frequently associated with internet trolling